Windermere is a suburb in the heart of Durban, South Africa. The area includes the restaurant district of Florida Road and the factory shop district of Stamford Hill Road.

References

External links

Suburbs of Durban
Populated places in eThekwini Metropolitan Municipality